Jefferson Davis Brodhead (January 12, 1859 – April 23, 1920), also known as J. Davis Brodhead and Joseph Davis Brodhead, was an American lawyer and politician who served as a Democratic member of the U.S. House of Representatives from Pennsylvania for one term from 1907 to 1909.

Life and career
J. Davis Brodhead (son of Richard Brodhead) was born in Easton, Pennsylvania.  He attended the public schools, studied law, was admitted to the bar in 1881 and commenced practice in Stroudsburg, Pennsylvania.  

He was elected as district attorney of Northampton County, Pennsylvania, in 1889.  He was a delegate to the Democratic National Conventions in 1892 and 1904.

Brodhead was elected as a Democrat to the Sixtieth Congress.  He was an unsuccessful candidate for renomination in 1908.  He resumed the practice of law in South Bethlehem, Pennsylvania.  He was appointed judge of the courts of record of Northampton County in 1914.  

He died in Washington, D.C., in 1920.  Interment in Easton Cemetery in Easton.

Sources

The Political Graveyard

1859 births
1920 deaths
Pennsylvania lawyers
Pennsylvania state court judges
Politicians from Easton, Pennsylvania
Democratic Party members of the United States House of Representatives from Pennsylvania
Jefferson Davis family